Antonio Delamea Mlinar (born 10 June 1991) is a retired Slovenian footballer who played as a defender.

Club career
In January 2017, Delamea Mlinar signed with the New England Revolution of Major League Soccer.

International career
In November 2016, Delamea Mlinar received his first call-up to the senior Slovenia squad for the matches against Malta and Poland. His debut was in the friendly match against Poland on 14 November, as a replacement for Miral Samardžić.

Personal life
Delamea Mlinar received a U.S. green card in February 2018, which qualifies him as a domestic player for MLS roster purposes.

Honours
Interblock
Slovenian Cup: 2008–09

Olimpija Ljubljana
Slovenian PrvaLiga: 2015–16
Slovenian Cup: 2020–21

References

External links
 Player profile at NZS 
 

1991 births
Living people
Sportspeople from Celje
Slovenian footballers
Association football defenders
Slovenia youth international footballers
Slovenia under-21 international footballers
Slovenia international footballers
NK Aluminij players
NK IB 1975 Ljubljana players
NK Olimpija Ljubljana (2005) players
New England Revolution players
Slovenian PrvaLiga players
Slovenian Second League players
Major League Soccer players
Slovenian expatriate footballers
Expatriate soccer players in the United States
Slovenian expatriate sportspeople in the United States